The Grand Brighton Hotel is a historic Victorian sea front hotel in Brighton on the south coast of England. Designed by John Whichcord Jr. and built in 1864, it was intended for members of the upper classes visiting the city, and remains one of Brighton's most expensive hotels.

During the 1984 Conservative Party conference, the hotel was bombed by the Provisional Irish Republican Army (IRA) in an attempt to assassinate Prime Minister Margaret Thatcher.

History
The Grand Hotel was designed by architect John Whichcord Jr., and built in 1864 on the site occupied previously by the West Battery at Artillery Place, one of Brighton's 18th-century coastal fortifications.  It was built for members of the upper classes visiting Brighton and Hove and remains one of the most expensive hotels in the city. Among its advanced engineering features at the time was the "Ascending Omnibus", a hydraulically-powered lift powered by cisterns in the roof. This was the first lift built in the United Kingdom outside London, at a time when only two others had been installed. The building itself is an example of Italian influence in Victorian architecture.

1984 bombing

The hotel was bombed by the Provisional Irish Republican Army (IRA) in the early morning of 12 October 1984, in an attempt to assassinate Prime Minister Margaret Thatcher during the Conservative Party conference. The bomb exploded at 2:51am. It had been hidden three weeks earlier behind the bath panel of room 629.

Thatcher survived the bombing, but five other people were killed in the attack, including Roberta Wakeham, wife of the government's Chief Whip John Wakeham, and the Conservative MP Sir Anthony Berry. Norman Tebbit, a member of the Cabinet, was injured, along with his wife Margaret, who was left paralysed.  Thatcher insisted that the conference open on time the next day and made her speech as planned in defiance of the bombers, a gesture which won widespread approval across the political spectrum.

The hotel was re-opened on 28 August 1986. The re-inauguration was attended by Thatcher who spoke at a reception to celebrate the reopening. Tebbit accompanied her during the reopening. Concorde flew low from the south to salute the opening.

Later history
The hotel belonged to the De Vere Group, beginning in the 1990s. De Vere Hotels undertook a multimillion-pound refurbishment of The Grand which was completed in 2013.  Another refurbishment project concluded in 2019.

On 15 October 2011, the Grand Hotel was inducted into the Brighton Walk of Fame and is only the third structure in Brighton to be recognised by the Walk of Fame committee. The hotel has hosted many famous guests, including ABBA who partied in the appropriately named first-floor Napoleon Suite following their 1974 Eurovision Song Contest win with their performance of 'Waterloo'. Other famous faces who have performed in The Grand Brighton's Empress Suite include singer Jessie J, Rizzle Kicks, The Saturdays, Elbow and Sugababes.

De Vere Hotels sold the Grand in 2014 to Wittington Investments for £50 million.  This company in turn sold the hotel to Leonardo Hotels, part of the Fattal Group, in February 2023.

Facilities
There are 201 rooms in the hotel, including 8 singles, 115 standard twin and standard double rooms, 31 sea-view twin and sea-view double rooms, 42 "sea-view deluxe" rooms and 4 sea-view suites, including the "Presidential Suite". It offers bespoke conferencing facilities for up to 1,000 guests. The Empress Suite, is the country's largest sea-facing conference suite and has the capacity to hold 1,000 guests. It is commonly used as a matrimonial venue for weddings, along with the hotel's Regent room (a former Victorian library) and first-floor suites.

The Grand Brighton hotel is also home to Cyan restaurant and bar, an all-day dining spot which still features original 155-year-old marble pillars around its central bar area.

Management
The current manager is Andrew Mosley, who joined the hotel in May 2010.

The Grand Brighton has been praised for its industry-leading approach to management of employee engagement in the hospitality industry, winning 'Best Employer in UK Hospitality' at the 2019 Cateys award ceremony hosted by The Caterer.

Film and television appearances

Amongst many appearances in television and film, the Grand Hotel was visited by the Trotter family in 1992, in an episode of the BBC Television comedy Only Fools and Horses entitled "Mother Nature's Son". The hotel has also been featured in ITV's Coronation Street.

The hotel was the subject of the documentary The Grand written and presented by Robert Longden for Southern Television.

The hotel also featured in the film Quadrophenia where Sting's character "the Ace Face" was the bellboy.

See also

Grade II listed buildings in Brighton and Hove: E–H

References

Bibliography

External links

DeVere Hotels page

1864 establishments in England
Grade II listed buildings in Brighton and Hove
Hotels established in 1864
Hotels in Brighton and Hove
Italianate architecture in England